The 2010 Rally de Portugal was the 44th Rally de Portugal and the sixth round of the 2010 World Rally Championship season. The rally took place over May 27–30, and was based in Faro, the capital city of the Algarve region. The rally was also the second round of the Junior World Rally Championship and the fifth round of the Super 2000 World Rally Championship.

After losing the lead on the final stage in New Zealand, Citroën Junior Team driver Sébastien Ogier took his first WRC victory by 7.9 seconds ahead of championship leader Sébastien Loeb. Third place went to Loeb's team-mate Dani Sordo, with Mikko Hirvonen edging out Petter Solberg for fourth place on the final run through the super-special stage at the Estádio Algarve. Ogier's victory lifted him into second place in the championship standings, 38 points behind Loeb, after his sixth podium finish out of six rallies in 2010.


Results

Event standings

Special stages

Standings after the rally

Drivers' Championship standings

Manufacturers' Championship standings

References

External links 
 Results at eWRC.com

Portugal
Rally de Portugal
Rally de Portugal